The men's  Semi-Contact category at the  W.A.K.O. World Championships 2007 in Coimbra was the fifth-heaviest of the male Semi-Contact tournaments falling between middleweight and light heavyweight when compared to Full-Contact's weight classes. There were sixteen fighters from four continents (Europe, Asia, North America and Oceania) taking part in the competition.  Each of the matches was three rounds of two minutes each and were fought under Semi-Contact rules.

The tournament gold medallist was the Hungarian Zsolt Moradi who defeated Neri Stella from Italy by points decision in the final.  As a result of their semi final finishes, Ireland's Mark McDermott and Bulgarian Mitko Kostadinov won bronze medals.

Results

Key

See also 
 List of WAKO Amateur World Championships
 List of WAKO Amateur European Championships
 List of male kickboxers

References

External links 
 WAKO World Association of Kickboxing Organizations Official Site

Kickboxing events at the WAKO World Championships 2007 Coimbra
2007 in kickboxing
Kickboxing in Portugal